The Amazing Book Is Not on Fire is a humorous autobiographical book by Daniel Howell and Phil Lester, released on 8 October 2015 by Ebury Publishing.

Reception 
The Amazing Book Is Not on Fire took the number-two spot on The Official UK Top 50 and took the number-one spot of Hardback Non-Fiction list. It sold 26,744 copies in a week. Common Sense Media rated the book at four stars, calling it "a lively, engaging, and surprisingly thoughtful and thorough look at what it takes to make successful YouTube videos."

References

External links 
 Official website

2015 non-fiction books
Books by YouTubers
Dan and Phil
Debut books
English-language books
Ebury Publishing books